Athipattu is a census town in Chennai in Thiruvallur district  in the state of Tamil Nadu, India. The neighbourhood is served by Athipattu railway station of the Chennai Suburban Railway network. it is a suburb in northern part of Chennai.

Demographics
 India census, Athipattu had a population of 8,382. Males constitute 50% of the population and females 50%. Athipattu has an average literacy rate of 72%, higher than the national average of 59.5%; with 56% of the males and 44% of females literate. 11% of the population is under 6 years of age.

References

Neighbourhoods in Chennai
Cities and towns in Tiruvallur district